Disintegrin and metalloproteinase domain-containing protein 12 (previously Meltrin) is an enzyme that in humans is encoded by the ADAM12 gene. ADAM12 has two splice variants: ADAM12-L, the long form, has a transmembrane region and ADAM12-S, a shorter variant, is soluble and lacks the transmembrane and cytoplasmic domains.

Function 

This gene encodes a member of the ADAM (a disintegrin and metalloprotease) protein family. Members of this family are membrane-anchored proteins structurally related to snake venom disintegrins, and have been implicated in a variety of biological processes involving cell-cell and cell-matrix interactions, including fertilization, muscle development, and neurogenesis. This gene has two alternatively spliced transcripts: a shorter secreted form and a longer membrane-bound form. The shorter form is found to stimulate myogenesis.

Clinical Significance 

ADAM 12, a metalloprotease that binds insulin growth factor binding protein-3 (IGFBP-3), appears to be an effective early Down syndrome marker. Decreased levels of ADAM 12 may be detected in cases of trisomy 21 as early as 8 to 10 weeks gestation. Maternal serum ADAM 12 and PAPP-A levels at 8 to 9 weeks gestation in combination with maternal age yielded a 91% detection rate for Down syndrome at a 5% false-positive rate. When nuchal translucency data from approximately 12 weeks gestation was added, this increased the detection rate to 97%.

ADAM12 has also been implicated in the development of pathology in various cancers, hypertension, liver fibrogenesis, and asthma. In asthma, ADAM12 is upregulated in lung epithelium in response to TNF-alpha.

Interactions 

ADAM12 has been shown to interact with:
 ACTN2,
 IGFBP3,  and
 PIK3R1.

References

Further reading

External links
 The MEROPS online database for peptidases and their inhibitors: M12.212
 ADAM12 on the Atlas of Genetics and Oncology
 

Proteases
Human proteins
EC 3.4.24